was a Japanese composer.

Life
Moroi was self-taught in composition while studying at the Tokyo Imperial University before moving in 1932 to Germany to study in the Berlin Musikhochschule under Leo Schrattenholz and Walter Gmeindl. While Moroi had been active in the Tokyo musical scene, forming with other colleagues a society named Surya, he claimed that his creative life truly started from his Berlin days. Returning to Japan in 1934, he built a successful career in subsequent years. His work was part of the music event in the art competition at the 1936 Summer Olympics.

Soon after completing his Symphony No. 3 in 1944 he was called up by the Japanese Army to serve in the Pacific War. Following the country's surrender he focused on teaching and writing books on music theory, composing just eight works in the following three decades, including two more symphonies. In his last works he turned to the twelve-tone system.

Pupils of Moroi include Ikuma Dan, Toriro Miki, Toshiharu Ichikawa (市川都志春), Yoshirō Irino, Kunio Toda (戸田邦雄), Minao Shibata, Sōkichi Ozaki (尾崎宗吉), Akio Yashiro, Chūji Kinoshita (木下忠司), and Im Won-sik. His son Makoto Moroi was also a composer.

List of works

Orchestral
 Symphonic Fragments (交響的断章 Kōkyōteki danshō) (1928); formerly Op. 19
 Symphony No. 1 in C minor, Op. 8 (1933)
 Symphony No. 2, Op. 16 (1937–1938)
 Imperial Army Ode (皇軍頌歌 Kōgun shōka), Symphonic Poem (1942)
   3. Banri no soto (萬里の外)
 Two Symphonic Movements (交響的二楽章 Kōkyōteki ni gakushō), Op. 22 (1942)
 The Admiral, Killed in Action (提督戦死 Teitoku senshi), Symphonic Poem (1943) 
 Praise the Dawn (黎明を讃ふ Reimei wo tatau), Symphonic Fantasy in C major (1943)
 Sinfonietta for Children (こどものための小交響曲 Kodomo no tame no shō-kōkyōkyoku) in B, Op. 24 (1943)
 Symphony No. 3, Op. 25 (1943–1944)
 Ovation on Toward Victory (勝利への歓呼 Shōri e no kanko), Overture (1944) 
 Symphony No. 4, Op. 27 (1951)
 Symphony No. 5 "Academic Festival Symphony" (大学祝典交響曲 Daigaku shukuten kōkyōkyoku), Op. 29 (1970)

Concertante
 Concerto in F minor for piano and orchestra (1927); formerly Op. 6
 Concerto No. 1 in C major for piano and orchestra, Op. 7 (1933)
 Concerto for cello and orchestra, Op. 12 (1936)
 Concerto for bassoon and orchestra, Op. 14 (1937); lost
 Concerto for violin and orchestra, Op. 18 (1939)
 Allegro (アレグロ) for piano and orchestra, Op. 26 (1947)
 Concerto No. 2 for piano and orchestra, Op. 31 (1977)

Chamber
 Sonata No. 1 for cello and piano (1927)
 Piano Trio in B minor (1927)
 Sonata No. 1 for violin and piano (1927)
 Sonata No. 2 for cello and piano (1928)
 Sonata No. 3 for cello and piano (1929)
 Sonata No. 2 for violin and piano (1929)
 Piano Quintet (1930)
 String Quartet, Op. 6 (1933)
 Piano Quartet, Op. 9 (1934)
 Sonata for viola and piano, Op. 11 (1935)
 Trio for cello, viola da gamba and harpsichord, Op. 13 (1936)
 Sonata for flute and piano, Op. 15 (1937)
 String Sextet, Op. 17 (1939)
 String Trio, Op. 19 (1939)
 Sonata for horn and piano, Op. 32 (1977)

Piano
Moroi composed a total of ten sonatas for piano: three early sonatas, five numbered sonatas written between 1927 and 1931, and a second set of two numbered sonatas with opus numbers written in 1933 and 1939.
 Sonata (1920)
 Sonata (1922)
 Sonata in D minor (1923)
 Sonata No. 1 in D major (1927)
 Sonata No. 2 in A minor (1927)
 Sonata No. 3 (1928)
 Sonata No. 4 (1929)
 Prelude (前奏曲 Zensōkyoku) (1930)
 Sonata No. 5 (1931)
 Sonata No. 1, Op. 5 (1933)
 Sonata No. 2, Op. 20 (1939)
 Suite for Piano (ピアノのための組曲 Piano no tame no kumikyoku) (1942)
 Preludio and Allegro giocoso (前奏曲とアレグロ・ジョコーソ) (1971)

Choral
 Prayer for Peace (平和の祈り Heiwa no inori), Cantata (1950)
 A Visit of the Sun (太陽のおとずれ Taiyō no otozure), Fantasy-Oratorio for baritone, female chorus and orchestra, Op. 28 (1968)

Vocal
 Kokyoku (小曲) for voice and piano (1926); words by Atsuo Ōki (大木惇夫)
 The Boy (少年 Shōnen) for voice and piano (1926); words by Tatsuji Miyoshi
 Wind, Light, Leaves (風、光、木の葉 Kaze, hikari, konoha) for voice and piano (1926); words by Atsuo Ōki (大木惇夫)
 Gingko Tree (公孫樹 Ichō) for voice and piano (1927); words by Shigeo Inoue (井上思外雄)
 The Deathbed (臨終 Rinjū) for voice and cello (1928); words by Chūya Nakahara
 Morning Song (朝の歌 Asa no uta) for voice and cello (1928); words by Chūya Nakahara
 Munashiki aki (空しき秋) for voice and piano (1929); words by Chūya Nakahara
 The Pram (乳母車 Ubaguruma) for voice and piano (1931); words by Tatsuji Miyoshi
 Two Songs (2つの歌曲 Futatsu no kakyoku) for soprano and orchestra, Op. 10 (1935); words by Chūya Nakahara
   Spring and Baby (春と赤ん坊 Haru to akanbō)
   My Sister (妹よ Imo yo)
 Tōki yama miyu (遠き山見ゆ) for voice and piano, Op. 33 (1977); words by Tatsuji Miyoshi

References

 Notes by Morihide Katayama from the Naxos Records release of Moroi's Symphony No. 3, Two Symphonic Movements and Sinfonietta.

External links
 Saburō Moroi biography at Naxos

1903 births
1977 deaths
20th-century classical composers
20th-century Japanese composers
20th-century Japanese male musicians
Japanese classical composers
Japanese male classical composers
Musicians from Tokyo
Olympic competitors in art competitions
Imperial Japanese Army personnel of World War II